This is a list of notable events in music that took place in the year 1948.

Specific locations
1948 in British music
1948 in Norwegian music

Specific genres
1948 in country music
1948 in jazz

Events
January 10 – The Amadeus Quartet gives its first recital under this name, at the Wigmore Hall in London.
February 25 – First Nice Jazz Festival with Louis Armstrong, Stéphane Grappelli, Claude Luter, Mezz Mezzrow and Django Reinhardt. It is during this first edition that Suzy Delair sings for the first time the song "C'est si bon" to a cabaret where Louis Armstrong ended his evening.
March 20 – Renowned Italian conductor Arturo Toscanini makes his television debut, conducting the NBC Symphony Orchestra in the United States in a program featuring the works of Richard Wagner.
April 3 – Beethoven's Symphony No. 9 is played on television in its entirety for the first time in a concert featuring Toscanini conducting the NBC Symphony Orchestra. The chorus was prepared by Robert Shaw.
April 21 – National Youth Orchestra of Great Britain gives its first concert.
May 20 – The Second International Congress of Composers and Music Critics 1948 opens in Prague.
June 5 – Opening of the first Aldeburgh Festival, founded by Benjamin Britten, Eric Crozier and Peter Pears.
Summer – John Cage begins teaching at Black Mountain College in North Carolina.
June 21 – Columbia Records introduces the long-playing record album in a public demonstration at the Waldorf-Astoria Hotel in New York City.
November 29 – First live telecast of a complete opera by the Metropolitan Opera, of the opening-night performance of Giuseppe Verdi's Otello, starring Ramón Vinay, Licia Albanese, and Leonard Warren, on ABC-TV
December – Perry Como has his first television Christmas Special.
Hans Werner Henze becomes musical assistant at the Deutscher Theater in Konstanz.
Al Jolson is voted the "Most Popular Male Vocalist" of the year by a Variety poll.
Patti Page becomes the first artist to use the technique of multi-track overdubbing (later popularized by Les Paul & Mary Ford).
Columbia Records introduces the  rpm LP ("long playing") record at New York's Waldorf-Astoria Hotel, featuring 25 minutes of music per side, compared to the four minutes per side of the 78 rpm record, the previous standard for gramophone records.
Otis Rush moves to Chicago and begins his musical career.
Igor Stravinsky and Robert Craft meet for the first time.
Quartetto Cetra dubs the choruses for the Italian release of Disney's Dumbo.
Gabriel von Wayditch begins work on his last opera The Heretics, which is still not completed when he dies in 1969. However, he completed the piano score of the massive 8.5 hour work, which is listed in the Guinness Book of World Records as the world's longest opera.
Bruno Maderna meets Hermann Scherchen for the first time: a fundamental encounter.
John Serry Sr. meets his mentor, the composer Robert Strassburg for the first time.

Albums released
The Jolson Album Vol. 2 – Al Jolson
Christmas Songs by Sinatra – Frank Sinatra
Selections from Road to Rio – Bing Crosby, Andrews Sisters
Concierto de Aranjuez — Regino Sainz de la Maza and the Orquesta Nacional de España

Top popular records

The following songs appeared in The Billboard's 'Best Selling Retail Records', 'Records Most-Played On the Air' and 'Most Played Juke Box Records' charts, starting November 1947 and before December 1948. Each week fifteen points were awarded to the number one record, then nine points for number two, eight points for number three, and so on. This system rewards songs that reach the highest positions, as well as those that had the longest chart runs. The total of a song's complete chart run is determined (never cutoff at the end of December, as in The Billboard's year-end lists), then the three Popular charts are combined, with that number determining a record's year-end rank. Regional charts determine the 11-25 rankings each week, and records that failed to score on the main chart were ranked by highest position. If a record only scored on one or two of the popular charts, it will obviously rank lower than a national hit on radios and juke boxes. Additional information from other sources is reported, but not used for ranking. This includes dates obtained from the "Discography of American Historical Recordings" website, chart performance from 'Most Played Juke Box Race Records', 'Most Played Juke Box Folk (Hillbilly) Records', 'Cashbox', and other sources as noted.

The Billboard's Top Race Records

The following songs appeared in The Billboard's Most-Played Juke Box Race Records and Best-Selling Retail Race Records charts, starting November 1947 through November 1948. Each week twenty points were awarded to the number one record, then fourteen points for number two, thirteen points for number three, and so on. This system rewards songs that reach the highest positions, as well as those that had the longest chart runs. Also see Billboard Top Race Records of 1948.

Published popular music

 "'A' You're Adorable" words and music: Buddy Kaye, Fred Wise & Sidney Lippman
 "Always True to You in My Fashion" w.m. Cole Porter introduced by Lisa Kirk in the musical Kiss Me, Kate. Performed in the film version by Ann Miller and Tommy Rall
"Another Op'nin', Another Show" w.m. Cole Porter introduced by Annabelle Hill and the ensemble in the musical Kiss Me, Kate
 "Baby, It's Cold Outside" w.m. Frank Loesser
 "Be A Clown" w.m. Cole Porter introduced by Judy Garland and Gene Kelly in the film The Pirate
 "Bibbidi-Bobbidi-Boo (The Magic Song)" w.m. Mack David, Al Hoffman & Jerry Livingston
 "Black Coffee" w. Paul Francis Webster m. Sonny Burke
 "Black Market" w.m. Frederick Hollander
 "Blue Christmas" w.m. Billy Hayes & Jay Johnson
 "The Blue Skirt Waltz" w. Mitchell Parish m. Vaclav Blaha
 "Brush Those Tears From Your Eyes" w.m. Oakley Haldeman, Al Trace & Jimmy Lee
 "Brush Up Your Shakespeare" w.m. Cole Porter introduced by Harry Clark and Jack Diamond in the musical Kiss Me, Kate. Memorably Performed in the film version by Keenan Wynn and James Whitmore.
 "Busy Line" Semes, Stanton
 "Candy Kisses" w.m. George Morgan
 "Careless Hands" w. Bob Hilliard m. Carl Sigman
 "Comme Ci, Comme Ça" w. (Eng) Joan Whitney & Alex Kramer (Fr) Pierre Dudan m. Bruno Coquatrix
 "A Couple Of Swells" w.m. Irving Berlin. Introduced by Fred Astaire and Judy Garland in the film Easter Parade
 "The Deck Of Cards" w.m. T. Texas Tyler
 "Don't Look Now But My Heart Is Showing" w. Ann Ronell m. Kurt Weill from the film version of One Touch of Venus
 "Far Away Places" w.m. Joan Whitney & Alex Kramer
 "Forever And Ever" w. (Eng) Malia Rosa (Ger) Franz Winkler m. Franz Winkler
 "Girls Were Made To Take Care Of Boys" w.m. Ralph Blane
 "Hair Of Gold, Eyes Of Blue" w.m. Sunny Skylar
 "Hang On The Bell, Nellie" w.m. Tommie Connor, Clive Erard & Ross Parker
 "Hooray for Love" w. Leo Robin m. Harold Arlen. Introduced by Tony Martin in the film Casbah
 "I Am Ashamed That Women Are So Simple" w.m. Cole Porter. Introduced by Patricia Morison in the musical Kiss Me Kate.
 "I'm Beginning To Miss You" w.m. Irving Berlin
 "I've Come To Wive It Wealthily In Padua" w.m. Cole Porter introduced by Alfred Drake in the musical Kiss Me, Kate. Sung in the film version by Howard Keel.
 "I've Got a Lovely Bunch of Coconuts" w.m. Fred Heatherton
 "Make A Miracle" w.m. Frank Loesser. Introduced by Ray Bolger and Allyn McLerie in the musical Where's Charley?
 "My Darling, My Darling" w.m. Frank Loesser. Introduced in the musical Where's Charley? by Byron Palmer and Doretta Morrow
 "My Happiness" w. Betty Peterson m. Borney Bergantine
 "N'yot N'yow (The Pussycat Song)" w.m. Dick Manning
 "O Mein Papa" w.m. Paul Burkhard
 "Once In Love With Amy" w.m. Frank Loesser
 "Pecos Bill" w. Johnny Lange m. Eliot Daniel
 "Powder Your Face With Sunshine" w.m. Carmen Lombardo & Stanley Rochinski
 "Red Roses For A Blue Lady" w.m. Sid Tepper & Roy C. Bennett
 "Say Something Sweet" w.m. Sid Tepper & Roy C. Bennett
 "Shoes With Wings On" w. Ira Gershwin m. Harry Warren
 "So In Love" w.m. Cole Porter introduced by Patricia Morison in the musical Kiss Me, Kate. Performed in the film version by Kathryn Grayson and Howard Keel.
 "Sunflower" Mack David
 "Tennessee Waltz" w.m. Redd Stewart & Pee Wee King
 "The Three Bells" w. (Eng) Bert Reisfeld m. Jean Villard Gilles
 "Time Out For Tears" w.m. Abe Schiff & Irving Berman
 "Tom, Dick or Harry" w.m. Cole Porter introduced by Lisa Kirk, Harold Lang, Edwin Clay and Charles Wood in the musical Kiss Me, Kate. Sung in the film version by Ann Miller, Tommy Rall, Bobby Van and Bob Fosse.
 "Too Darn Hot" w.m. Cole Porter introduced by Lorenzo Fuller, Fred Davis and Eddie Sledge in the musical Kiss Me, Kate. Ann Miller sang and danced the number in the film version.
 "A Tree In The Meadow" w.m. Billy Reid
 "Uncle Charlie's Polka" m. John Serry Sr.
 "Where Is The Life That Late I Led?" w.m. Cole Porter introduced by Alfred Drake in the musical Kiss Me, Kate. Sung by Howard Keel in the film version.
 "Why Can't You Behave?" w.m. Cole Porter introduced by Lisa Kirk and Harold Lang in the musical Kiss Me, Kate. Performed by Ann Miller in the film version.
 "Wunderbar" w.m. Cole Porter introduced by Alfred Drake and Patricia Morison in the musical Kiss Me, Kate. Performed by Howard Keel and Kathryn Grayson.
 "You Came A Long Way From St Louis" w. Bob Russell m. John Benson Brooks
 "You Can't Be True, Dear" w.(Eng) Hal Cotton (Ger) Gerhard Ebeler m. Hans Otten
 "You Say The Nicest Things, Baby" w. Harold Adamson m. Jimmy McHugh
 "You Was" w. Paul Francis Webster m. Sonny Burke
 "You're All I Want For Christmas" w.m. Glen Moore & Seger Ellis
 "You're Breaking My Heart" w.m. Pat Genaro & Sunny Skylar

Classical music

Premieres

Compositions
Yasushi Akutagawa
Trinita sinfonica
String Quartet
La danse for piano
George Antheil –
Violin Sonata No. 4
String Quartet No. 3
Pierre Boulez – Piano Sonata No. 2
Havergal Brian – Symphony No. 7
John Cage –
Sonatas and Interludes for prepared piano
Suite for Toy Piano
Elliott Carter – Sonata for cello and piano
Aaron Copland –
The Red Pony suite
Clarinet Concerto
George Crumb – Alleluja for unaccompanied chorus
Einar Englund – Symphony No. 2 Blackbird
Ross Lee Finney – String Quartet No. 5
Paul Hindemith – Suite französischer Tänze
Vagn Holmboe – Concerto No. 11 for trumpet and orchestra (his only trumpet concerto, but once called Chamber Concerto No. 11 because of its scoring)
Joseph Jongen – La musique for soprano, string quartet, and piano, Op. 135, No. 2
Dmitry Kabalevsky – Violin Concerto in C major
Bohuslav Martinů –
Piano Concerto No. 3
The Strangler (ballet)
Toshiro Mayuzumi –
Divertimento, for ten instruments
Rumba Rhapsody for orchestra
Nikolai Myaskovsky – Cello Sonata No. 2
Andrzej Panufnik – Symphony No. 1 Sinfonia Rustica
Francis Poulenc – Sonata for cello and piano, Op. 143 (1948)
Alan Rawsthorne – Violin Concerto No. 1
Pierre Schaeffer – Étude aux chemins de fer
William Schuman – Symphony No. 6
John Serry Sr. –
Consolation Waltz
Bugle Polka
Harold Shapero – Symphony for Classical Orchestra
Dmitri Shostakovich
From Jewish Folk Poetry (song cycle)
The Young Guard (film score)
Richard Strauss – Four Last Songs
Igor Stravinsky – Mass for chorus and double wind quintet
Eduard Tubin – Double Bass Concerto
Heitor Villa-Lobos
Fantasia for saxophone, three horns, and strings
 Piano Concerto No. 2
Bachianas brasileiras No.5, arranged for piano and voice
Chris Mary Francine Whittle – Piano Concerto
Akio Yashiro – Trio for violin, cello, and piano

Opera
Arthur Bliss – The Olympians (Premiered 1949)
Sergei Prokofiev — The Story of a Real Man (opera, completed this year)

Film
Arnold Bax – Oliver Twist (1948 film)
Max Steiner – Key Largo (film)
Dimitri Tiomkin – Red River (1948 film)
Ralph Vaughan Williams – Scott of the Antarctic (film)

Musical theatre
  A La Carte London production
  As the Girls Go Broadway production
 Bob's Your Uncle (Frank Eyton & Noel Gay) London production opened at the Saville Theatre on May 5 and ran for 363 performances
  The Boltons Revue London production
 Cage Me a Peacock (Music: Eve Lynd Lyrics: Adam Leslie Book: Noel Langley) London production opened at the Strand Theatre on June 18 and ran for 337 performances
 Caribbean Rhapsody London production
 Carissima London production opened at the Palace Theatre on March 10 and ran for 488 performances
  Down in the Valley Broadway production
 High Button Shoes (Jule Styne and Sammy Cahn) – London production opened at the Hippodrome on December 22 and ran for 291 performances
 Imperial Violets Paris production
  Inside U.S.A. Broadway production loosely based on the book Inside U.S.A. by John Gunther. Arthur Schwartz (music) and Howard Dietz (lyrics). Opened on Broadway at the New Century Theatre on April 30, 1948, and run for 399 performances
 The Kid from Stratford London production opened at the Prince's Theatre on September 30 and ran for 235 performances
  Kiss Me, Kate (Cole Porter) – Broadway production opened on December 30 at the New Century Theatre and ran for 1077 performances
  Lend an Ear Broadway production
  Look Ma, I'm Dancin'! Broadway production
  Love Life Broadway production
 Maid to Measure London revue opened at the Cambridge Theatre on May 20. Starring Jessie Matthews, Tommy Fields, Joan Heal and Lew Parker.
  Magdalena Broadway production
  Make Mine Manhattan Broadway production
  Moonshine New Haven production
 My Romance (Sigmund Romberg and Rowland Leigh) opened at the Shubert Theatre on October 19, transferred to the Adelphi Theatre (New York) on December 7 and ran for a total of 95 performances
  Oranges And Lemons London production
  Slings And Arrows London production
  That's The Ticket Broadway production
  Where's Charley? Broadway production opened on October 11 at the St. James Theatre and ran for 792 performances

Musical films
 April Showers starring Ann Sothern, Jack Carson, Robert Alda and S. Z. Sakall. Directed by James V. Kern.
 Are You With It? starring Donald O'Connor, Olga San Juan and Martha Stewart. Directed by Jack Hively.
  La Belle Meuniere
  Big City
  Bill and Coo
  Casbah starring Yvonne DeCarlo and Tony Martin.
  A Date with Judy starring Wallace Beery, Jane Powell and Elizabeth Taylor. Directed by Richard Thorpe.
  Deux Amours
  Easter Parade starring Judy Garland, Fred Astaire, Peter Lawford and Ann Miller. Directed by Charles Walter.
  The Emperor Waltz starring Bing Crosby, Joan Fontaine, Roland Culver, Richard Haydn and Lucille Watson. Directed by Billy Wilder.
  Fandango
  Feudin', Fussin' and A-Fightin' starring Donald O'Connor, Marjorie Main, Percy Kilbride and Penny Edwards. Directed by George Sherman.
  For the Love of Mary
  A Foreign Affair
  Give My Regards to Broadway
  Glamour Girl starring Virginia Grey and Gene Krupa & his Band. Directed by Arthur Dreifuss.
  The Glass Mountain
  If You Knew Susie
  The Kissing Bandit
  Ladies of the Chorus starring Adele Jergens and Marilyn Monroe
  Lulu Belle
  Luxury Liner
  Martin Block's Musical Merry Go Round
  Mary Lou
  Melody Time animated film including Johnny Appleseed and Pecos Bill
 Mexican Hayride
  Mickey
  A Miracle Can Happen
  The Miracle of the Bells
  Music Man
  On an Island with You starring Esther Williams, Peter Lawford and Jimmy Durante. Directed by Richard Thorpe.
  One Night with You
  One Sunday Afternoon starring Dennis Morgan and Janis Paige
 One Touch Of Venus released August, starring Ava Gardner, Robert Walker and Dick Haymes.
  The Paleface starring Bob Hope and Jane Russell
  The Pirate
  Rachel and the Stranger
  Romance on the High Seas
  So Dear to My Heart
  A Song Is Born starring Danny Kaye, Virginia Mayo and Benny Goodman
 Summer Holiday released on April 16 starring Mickey Rooney and Gloria DeHaven
  That Lady in Ermine starring Betty Grable and Douglas Fairbanks, Jr.
  Three Daring Daughters
  Two Guys From Texas
 Up In Central Park starring Deanna Durbin, Dick Haymes and Vincent Price. Directed by William Seiter.
  When My Baby Smiles At Me starring Betty Grable, Dan Dailey, June Havoc, Jack Oakie, James Gleason and Richard Arlen. Directed by Walter Lang.
  Words and Music
  You Were Meant for Me starring Jeanne Crain, Dan Dailey and Oscar Levant. Directed by Lloyd Bacon.

Births
January 2 – Kerry Minnear, rock keyboardist (Gentle Giant)
January 7 – Kenny Loggins, singer and songwriter (Loggins and Messina)
January 8 – Paul King, rock musician (Mungo Jerry)
January 10 – Donald Fagen, singer and songwriter (Steely Dan)
January 14 – T-Bone Burnett, record producer, artist
January 15 – Ronnie Van Zant, singer (Lynyrd Skynyrd) (died 1977)
January 16 – John Carpenter, film-maker and composer
January 22 – Gilbert Levine, American conductor and academic
January 23 – Anita Pointer (The Pointer Sisters)
January 26 – Corky Laing (Mountain)
January 27 – Kim Gardner (Ashton, Gardner and Dyke) (died 2001)
January 31 – Joyce Moreno, Brazilian singer-songwriter
February 1 – Rick James, singer, songwriter and record producer (died 2004)
February 2 – Al McKay (Earth, Wind & Fire)
February 4 – Alice Cooper, lead singer (Alice Cooper Band)
February 5
 David Denny (Steve Miller Band)
 Christopher Guest, actor and musician (This Is Spinal Tap)
February 7 – Jimmy Greenspoon, American keyboard player (Three Dog Night)
February 8
Dan Seals, American singer-songwriter and guitarist (England Dan & John Ford Coley) (died 2009)
Ron Tyson, American singer-songwriter (The Temptations), lead singer (The Ethics)
February 17 – José José (José Sosa Ortiz), Mexican Latin singer and instrumentalist (died 2019)
February 18 – Keith Knudsen, American singer-songwriter and drummer (The Doobie Brothers) (Southern Pacific) (died 2005)
February 19 – Tony Iommi, English heavy metal lead guitarist and songwriter (Black Sabbath)
February 28 – Geoff Nicholls, English heavy metal keyboard player (Black Sabbath) (died 2017)
March 2 – Rory Gallagher, musician, songwriter and bandleader (died 1995)
March 4 – Chris Squire, bassist (Yes) (The Syn) (died 2015)
March 5
 Eddy Grant, singer and songwriter
 Richard Hickox, conductor
March 8 – Little Peggy March, singer
March 9
Jeffrey Osborne, singer and songwriter
Jimmie Fadden, folk rock percussionist (Nitty Gritty Dirt Band)
Chris Thompson, singer & guitarist (Manfred Mann's Earth Band)
March 12 – James Taylor, singer-songwriter
March 17 – Fran Byrne (Ace)
March 22
 Andrew Lloyd Webber, composer
 Randy Hobbs (The McCoys)
March 24 – Lee Oskar (War)
March 25 – Michael Stanley, singer-songwriter and DJ
March 26
 Steven Tyler (Aerosmith)
 Richard Tandy (Electric Light Orchestra)
March 28
John Evans (Jethro Tull)
Milan Williams (Commodores)
March 30 – Jim Dandy (Black Oak Arkansas)
April 1
Jimmy Cliff, reggae singer
 Simon Crowe (The Boomtown Rats)
April 4
Pick Withers, drummer (Dire Straits)
Berry Oakley, bassist (The Allman Brothers Band) (died 1972)
April 7 – John Oates (Hall & Oates)
April 9
Chico Ryan (Sha Na Na)
Phil Wright (Paper Lace)
April 17 – Jan Hammer, composer, pianist and keyboard player
April 20 – Craig Frost (Grand Funk Railroad)
April 21 – Paul Davis, singer (died 2008)
April 27 – Kate Pierson (The B-52's)
April 30 – Wayne Kramer (MC5)
May 2 – Larry Gatlin, country singer
May 5 – Bill Ward (Black Sabbath)
May 6 – Mary MacGregor, singer
May 12
Ivan Kral, guitarist (Patti Smith Group)
Steve Winwood, R&B singer (Blind Faith)
May 15 – Brian Eno, synthesizer virtuoso and composer
May 19 – Tom Scott, American saxophonist, composer and bandleader
May 21 – Leo Sayer, singer-songwriter
May 24 – Ernst Jansz (Doe Maar)
May 25 – Klaus Meine (Scorpions)
May 26 – Stevie Nicks, American singer-songwriter (Fleetwood Mac)
May 27 – Pete Sears, keyboard player (Jefferson Starship, Hot Tuna)
May 29 – Michael Berkeley, composer and broadcaster
May 31 – John Bonham, rock drummer (Led Zeppelin)
June 16 – Nick Drake, singer-songwriter
June 20 – Alan Longmuir, pop guitarist (Bay City Rollers) (died 2018)
June 21 – Joey Molland, rock composer-guitarist (Badfinger)
June 22 – Todd Rundgren, singer and producer
June 24 
Richard Charteris, musicologist
Patrick Moraz, keyboard player (Yes) (The Moody Blues)
June 25 – Kenji Sawada, rock singer and songwriter
June 29 – Ian Paice (Deep Purple)
July 3 – Paul Barrere (Little Feat)
July 4 – Jeremy Spencer, guitarist (Fleetwood Mac)
July 7 – Larry Reinhardt (Iron Butterfly)
July 12 – Walter Egan, rock musician
July 18 – Philip Harris (Ace)
July 19 – Keith Godchaux (Grateful Dead)
July 21 – Cat Stevens, singer-songwriter
July 25 – Steve Goodman, folk singer-songwriter (died 1984)
August 8 – Andy Fairweather-Low, singer (Amen Corner)
August 10 – Patti Austin
August 12 – Tony Santini (Sha Na Na)
August 13 – Kathleen Battle, opera singer
August 16 – Barry Hay (Golden Earring)
August 19
 Susan Jacks, pop singer
 Elliot Lurie (Looking Glass)
August 20 – Robert Plant, singer (Led Zeppelin)
August 24 – Jean Michel Jarre, composer
August 28 – Daniel Seraphine (Chicago)
September 3 – Don Brewer (Grand Funk Railroad)
September 6 – Claydes Smith (Kool & the Gang)
September 11 – John Martyn, singer
September 13 – Nell Carter, US singer and actress
September 14 – Fred "Sonic" Smith, American guitarist (Husband of Patti Smith) (died 1994)
September 16 – Kenney Jones, drummer (The Faces, The Who)
September 17 – Raphy Leavitt, Puerto Rican-American accordion player and composer (died 2015)
September 26 – Olivia Newton-John, English-Australian singer, songwriter, actress, entrepreneur and activist (died 2022)
September 29 – Mark Farner (Terry Knight and the Pack, Grand Funk Railroad)
October 1 – Cub Koda (Brownsville Station)
October 5 – Delroy Wilson, reggae artist (died 1995)
October 8 – Johnny Ramone, guitarist (Ramones) (died 2004)
October 10 – Cyril Neville, The Neville Brothers
October 12 – Rick Parfitt, rock musician (Status Quo) (died 2016)
October 13 – Nusrat Fateh Ali Khan, Qawwali singer (died 1997)
October 15 – Chris de Burgh, singer and songwriter
October 19 – Patrick Simmons (The Doobie Brothers)
October 22 – Bo Holten, composer and conductor
October 24 – Dale Griffin, British rock drummer (Mott The Hoople, Mott, British Lions) (died 2016)
October 28
Rick Reynolds (Black Oak Arkansas)
 Telma Hopkins (Tony Orlando and Dawn)
November 3 – Lulu, singer and actress
November 6
Glenn Frey (Eagles) (died 2016)
 George Young (The Easybeats)
 Rushton Moreve (Steppenwolf)
November 16
Chi Coltrane, American singer-songwriter and pianist
Robert John "Mutt" Lange, South African record producer and songwriter (Shania Twain, Stevie Vann)
November 20 – Martti Wallén. opera singer
November 21 – Lonnie Jordan, funk singer-songwriter (War)
November 22 – Dennis Larden, sunshine pop singer-guitarist (Every Mother's Son)
December 1 – Eric Bloom, hard rock singer-songwriter (Blue Öyster Cult)
December 3 – Ozzy Osbourne, rock singer (Black Sabbath) (husband of Sharon Osbourne and father of Kelly Osbourne and Jack Osbourne)
December 4 – Southside Johnny (John Lyon), singer-songwriter
December 10 – Jessica Cleaves, The Friends of Distinction
December 13
Jeff 'Skunk' Baxter, rock guitarist (The Doobie Brothers, Steely Dan)
Ted Nugent, singer-songwriter
December 17 – Jim Bonfanti, rock drummer (Raspberries)
December 20 – Stevie Wright, The Easybeats
December 23 – Jim Ferguson, American guitarist, composer, author, educator and music journalist
December 25 – Barbara Mandrell, country music singer
December 28 – Larry Byrom, rock guitarist Steppenwolf
December 31
Stephen Cleobury, English choral conductor (died 2019)
Donna Summer, American soul and disco singer-songwriter, actor and painter (died 2012)

Deaths
January 8 – Richard Tauber, operatic tenor, 56 (lung cancer)
January 15 – Jack Guthrie, popular singer, 32 (tuberculosis)
January 21 – Ermanno Wolf-Ferrari, composer of comic operas, 72
January 26 – Ignaz Friedman, pianist and composer, 65
February 21 – Frederic Lamond, pianist, 80
April 21 – Carlos López Buchardo, composer, 66
April 24 – Manuel Ponce, composer, 65
April 25 – Fritz Crome, composer and music writer, 68
May 17
David Evans, composer, 74
Olga Samaroff, pianist and music critic, 67
June 1 – José Vianna da Motta, pianist and composer, 80
June 6 – Henrik Lund, lyricist, 72
June 14 – John Blackwood McEwen, Scottish composer and educator, 80
June 17 – Beryl Wallace, singer, dancer and actress, 35 (aviation accident)
June 20 – George Frederick Boyle, composer, 61
June 27 – George Templeton Strong, composer, 92
August 10
Lucille Bogan, blues singer, 51 (coronary sclerosis)
Emmy Hennings, cabaret performer, 63
August 13 – Elaine Hammerstein, Broadway star, 51 (car accident)
August 20 – David John de Lloyd, composer, 65
September 3 – Mutt Carey, jazz trumpeter, 61
September 12 – Rupert D'Oyly Carte, impresario, 70
September 14 – Vernon Dalhart, country singer, 65
October 25 – Boris Fomin, Russian folk composer, 48 (tuberculosis)
October 10 – Mary Eaton, dancer, 47 (liver failure)
October 24 – Franz Lehár, composer, 78
November 9 – Euphemia Allen, composer, 87
November 12 – Umberto Giordano, composer, 81
December 2 – Chano Pozo, percussionist, 33 (murdered)
December 5 – Kerry Mills, US violinist and songwriter, 79
December 10 – Francesco Bartolomeo de Leone, composer, 61
December 14 – R. O. Morris, British composer and teacher, 62
December 18 – William Arms Fisher, music historian, 87
December 22 – Donald Brian, actor, dancer and singer, 71

References

 
20th century in music
Music by year